Paul Goriss is an Australian basketball coach who coaches the University of Canberra Capitals. He is an assistant coach of the Australian women's national basketball team (the Opals) and for the Atlanta Dream of the WNBA.

Biography
Paul Goriss moved to Townsville when he was ten years old, and began playing basketball there. When he was seventeen he was asked to coach his younger brother Ben's under-14 side. He wound up coaching his brother' teams for several years, right up to the under-23s. He  won two state titles with the Townsville under-18s. In 2000, he moved to Canberra to become a men's basketball scholarship Coach at the Australian Institute of Sport (AIS). He returned to Townsville at the end of the year to coach the Townsville Heat, but came back to the AIS in 2003 as assistant coach of the men’s basketball program.

Goriss was an assistant coach of the Australian men's national under-19 basketball team (the Emus) that competed at the 2011 and 2013 FIBA Under-19 World Championships, and of South East Queensland Stars in the Women's National Basketball League (WNBL) during the latter part of the 2015/16 season. He was head coach of the Australian women's national under-19 basketball team (the Gems) at the 2015 FIBA Under-19 World Championship for Women in Russia, where they won bronze.

In March 2016, Goriss was appointed head coach of the University of Canberra Capitals in succession to Carrie Graf. The team required some rebuilding in the wake of the retirement of Graf and veteran players Jess Bibby and Lauren Jackson. Goriss assembled a team that looked impressive and championship material on paper, but solid performances from the Capitals' captain Natalie Hurst, Abbey Wehrung and Kate Gaze, the Capitals' court performance oscillated between disappointing and dismal. After an opening round win that saw them briefly on top of the WNBL ladder, the Capitals went on a thirteen-game losing streak, missing the finals for the seventh year in a row, and finishing sixth.

On 2 May 2017, Goriss was appointed an assistant coach of the Australian women's national basketball team (the Opals), working under the Opals' head coach Sandy Brondello, and alongside the Sydney University Flames' coach Cheryl Chambers, who was also named as an assistant coach. In the Opals' run up to the 2020 Tokyo Olympic Games, their immediate challenge was the 2017 FIBA Women's Asia Cup in Bangalore, India, in July 2017, where Australia needed a fourth-place finish in order to qualify for the FIBA Women's Basketball World Cup; they finished second, losing to Japan in the final. At the 2018 FIBA Women's Basketball World Cup in Tenerife, Spain, the Opals won silver, this time losing out to the United States in the final on 30 September 2018.

An intense recruiting effort saw the Capitals sign Kelly Wilson, Kelsey Griffin, Kristy Wallace, Opals Marianna Tolo and Leilani Mitchell, and Canadian player Kia Nurse. Goriss retained Carly Wilson as an assistant coach, and she was joined on the coaching bench by Phil Brown and Bec Goddard. The team looked impressive on paper, but were carrying a host of ailments, and Goriss was the first to remind people that basketball games are played on hardwood and not paper. Despite this, the Capitals won six of the first eight games without Tolo, and gradually became stronger as Tolo, Griffin and Mitchell recovered.  Goriss was intensely protective of his players, and was fined $2,500 for comments he made that were critical of the referees and officials after rough conduct by Perth Lynx player left Kelsey Griffin bleeding profusely from a head wound.

The 2018/19 WNBL season ended with the Capitals winning nine games in a row, and finishing on top of the ladder.  This became eleven after the Capitals notched up back-to-back semifinal wins against the Perth Lynx. Some 4,120 fans packed Canberra's AIS Arena to watch the Capitals defeat the Adelaide Lightning in the first game of the best-of-three Grand Final series, and then 4,817 for the third game after a controversial one-point loss to Adelaide to watch the Capitals post a 20-point win and claim an eighth premiership.

On 4 March 2019, Goriss's contract with the Capitals was extended for another two years. His retention was considered crucial to the Capitals re-signing players like Tolo, Griffin and Keely Froling. His popularity with the players is partly explained by his philosophy of putting the goals of the athletes first. "Whether you get recognised or not", he told an interview, "just do the right thing by the players, work on being a better coach and the players achieving their goals, not 'what next on my bucket list?'"

Notes

Year of birth missing (living people)
Living people
Australian men's basketball coaches
Canberra Capitals